Jehu-class landing craft (also referred to as U-700 class) are a class of military transport vessels used by the Finnish Navy. Manufactured by Marine Alutech under the designation Watercat M18 AMC, the boats can perform a multitude of tasks ranging from troop transport and landing operations to patrolling and escort tasks as well as combat and battle support operations. The Jehu-class boats are considerably larger and better armed that the preceding Jurmo-class landing craft.

History 

The new class of landing craft was ordered in October 2012 to supplement the existing Uisko and Jurmo classes as part of a project to improve the performance and equipment of the coastal troops. The cost for the first batch of 12 boats was about 34 million euro.

U701 operated from the dock of HMS Albion during exercises in May 2021.

General characteristics 

Their displacement at full load is 32 tons. The boats have an aluminium hull and a superstructure made of composite materials, and offer a ballistic protection which is at same level or even exceeds that of the Patria Pasi APC.

Served by a crew of six (two professional officers and four conscripts), the Jehu-class boats are designed to transport 25 troops in the enclosed cabin. In addition to landing and combat operations, the boats can be quickly converted for medical and evacuation tasks as well as act as command launches. The onboard amenities for the crew include a microwave oven, water boiler and a water toilet as well as heating and air conditioning systems.

For combat operations, the Jehu-class boats are armed with a Saab Trackfire Remote Weapon Station fitted with either 12.7mm NSV machine gun or a 40mm Heckler & Koch GMG grenade machine gun, and a coaxial 7.62mm PKM machine gun. In addition, the boats have pedestals for two crew-operated NSV machine guns. In future, the modular construction allows fitting of naval mine rails or a light anti-ship missile system.

See also 
 CB90-class fast assault craft
 Mark V Special Operations Craft

References 

Ships of the Finnish Navy
Ships built in Finland
Landing craft
Military boats